United Nations Security Council resolution 1342, adopted unanimously on 27 February 2001, after recalling all previous resolutions on Western Sahara, in particular resolutions 1108 (1997), 1292 (2000), 1301 (2000), 1309 (2000) and 1324 (2000), the Council extended the mandate of the United Nations Mission for the Referendum in Western Sahara (MINURSO) until 30 April 2001.

The Security Council reiterated its support for efforts by MINURSO and the United Nations and agreements adopted by Morocco and the Polisario Front to hold a free and fair referendum on self-determination for the people of Western Sahara. As with previous resolutions, the Council noted that fundamental differences remained between the parties on some aspects concerning the implementation of the Settlement Plan.

The mandate of MINURSO was extended on the condition that remaining differences between the parties would be resolved to reach a mutually acceptable solution. At the end of its mandate on 30 April 2001, the Secretary-General Kofi Annan was required to submit a report on the situation.

See also
 Free Zone (region)
 History of Western Sahara
 Political status of Western Sahara
 List of United Nations Security Council Resolutions 1301 to 1400 (2000–2002)
 Sahrawi Arab Democratic Republic
 Moroccan Western Sahara Wall

References

External links
 
Text of the Resolution at undocs.org

 1342
2001 in Morocco
 1342
 1342
February 2001 events
2001 in Western Sahara